WAVU (630 AM) is a radio station licensed to serve Albertville, Alabama, United States.  The station, founded in 1948, is owned by Sand Mountain Broadcasting Service, Inc.  The station is branded as Power 107.5 after its FM translator W298BG 107.5 FM licensed to Blue Mountain, Alabama.

WAVU broadcasts a Contemporary Christian music format and includes some news programming from AP Radio.

References

External links
WAVU official website

Radio Locator Information for W298BG

Contemporary Christian radio stations in the United States
Radio stations established in 1948
Marshall County, Alabama
1948 establishments in Alabama
AVU